Tyumenskaya oblast segodnya is a daily Russian socio-political tabloid. The area of distribution covers the territory of Tyumen region, Khanty-Mansi Autonomous Okrug, Yamalo-Nenets Autonomous Okrug. The newspaper is an official newspaper of the Government of the Tyumen Region. The newspaper publishes the official decrees, statements and documents of regional bodies. This includes the promulgation of newly approved laws. Regional government documents and legislative instruments come into force after their publication in the newspaper.

Readership of the newspaper includes: authorities (regional, city, district, rural), employees of government agencies, top-managers of regional enterprise, customer officers, pensioners, housewives and students.

Covered aspects: politics, economics, culture, agricultural sector, society, regional legislative documents, State procurement bulletins, tenders of the government and private companies.
The newspaper takes one of the leading positions among regional socio-political subscription newspapers. The newspaper has authority with readers - the editorship of the tabloid receives more than 350 letters per month.  The tabloid is known for its quickness of information layout: most part of the material is published immediately, at the next day after the event has been held.
The newspaper contains more than 10 topical supplements.

Editorial projects

 "Narodniy turisticheskii marshrut" (Russian: Нарóдный туристический маршрут; lit. "Public tour itinerary")
 Klub "Ot pervogo litsa" (Russian: Клуб «От первого лица», lit. Club "From the first person");
 "Sibirskaya glubinka" (Russian: Сибирская глубинка, lit: "The Siberian province");
 "Chitatel’ – nash verniy compas" (Russian:Читатель – наш верный компас, lit "The reader is our certain compass" ),
 "Arkhipastyri Sibiri" (Russian: Архипастыри Сибири, lit: "The Siberian arch-flamens ")
 "Koshelek" (Russian: Кошелек, lit: "A purse") and others.
Each of the projects is unique and has stir among the public

Internet
Since 2002 the newspaper has its own official web-site. In 2009 the new version, including modern interface, text content, photo- and video materials, has been developed. 45000 visitors attend the web-site per month, 11000 visitors – per week, 2000 – per day.
Since May,2011  Tyumenskaya oblast’ segodnya, first in the region has started to run on the iPad platform.

Editors in Chief
of Tyumenskaya oblast’ segodnya in chronological order
 Michail Semenovich Gorbachev (1998–2001)
 Raisa Petrovna Kovdenko (2001–2002)
 Alexander Nickolaevich Skorbenko (from 7 February 2002)

History

Tyumenskaya oblast’ segodnya began as a project of a group of journalists and was published by State Unitary Enterprise "Tyumen Regional News Agency" (GUP TO "TRIA"). Socio-political tabloid was established on 26 October 1998. Victor Gorbachev was appointed as an executive director and editor in chief. Certificate of state registration was received on 29 October 1998 and on the next day the newspaper was delivered to the retailers and subscribers. In 1998 the newspaper was published 3 times a week and since 1 January 1999 has become daily newspaper.

In July 2001 the new enterprise – State Organisation  GU"Tyumenskaya Pravda segodnya" (Russian: Тюменская правда сегодня, lit: The Tyumen Truth Today) has been built up. The Founder of the  company was Information Policy Department of the Tyumen Region. On 7 February 2002 Alexander Skorbenko was appointed as a director and editor in chief.
By the order of the governor - Sergey Sobyanin and the director of Information Policy Department of the Tyumen Region – Alexander Novopashin State Organisation  of the Tyumen Region GU TO"Tyumenskaya Pravda segodnya" was renamed into State Organisation  of the Tyumen Region "Tyumenskaya oblast’ segodnya". In February 2005, the company was reordered in ANO (autonomous non-commercial organization) "Tyumenskaya oblast’ segonya".  In 2006 the trademark on the company logo was registered  in National Registry of trademarks and service marks of the Russian Federation.

The total design has been changed several times. Since 2007 four-color process has been applied in newspaper printing.

The company is a member of Guild of publishers, distributors of the press product and Association of the publishers and distributors "Tyumen press". In 2005 the newspaper "Tyumenskaya oblast’ segodnya" became the top-selling newspaper in  Tyumen Region. In April 2009, the company made a contract with non-profit partnership "National mass-market service" (Moscow) to carry out independent expert examination and certify edition.

Since 1998 the company has overcome many difficulties: the structure, name and design of the company have been changed, the circulation has grown since 5 thousand copies in 1999 to 64 thousand copies of daily edition and 16 thousand copies of Thursday edition.

By its history "Tyumenskaya oblast’ segodnya"  demonstrates and proves that printed matter is high-effective way of providing information. By combining of modern ways of working and keeping faith to traditions of classical journalism, the newspaper is regarded as one of the most respective regional tabloid and is well known at the territory of Russian Federation.

New technologies

PDF – subscription. The subscribers receive the exact copy of paper newspaper in electronic format (PDF) on their e-mail.

RSS – subscription. RSS-newswire contains headline and first paragraph of each published news.

E-mail – subscription. The subscribers daily receive the list of headlines combined by heading with links to the materials published on the official web-site.

The next day newspaper review. Summary is published before the paper newspaper is issued.

Newspapers published in Russia
Tyumen
Publications established in 1998